Rajo may refer to:

 Rajo, Syria, a village in Syria
 Rajo Jack (1905–1956), American race car driver
 Rajo Singh (1928–2005), politician from Bihar, India
 Rajo Motor and Manufacturing, a company that manufactured Model T cylinder heads
 Rajo Nizamani, a town in Taluka, Tando Muhammad Khan district, Sindh, Pakistan